There are 41 national parks in Finland. They are all managed by the Metsähallitus. The national parks cover a total area of  – 2.7% of Finland's total land area.

A total of 3.2 million people visited the parks in 2018. During the Covid-19 pandemic, the number of national park visitors strongly increased, with a total of 8.5 million people visiting the parks in 2021.

List of national parks

See also

 Protected areas of Finland
 Strict nature reserves of Finland
 Wilderness areas of Finland

Other references on Wikipedia:
 Hagen, Ekenäs

References

External links

Finland's National Parks
National parks, hiking areas, wilderness areas
I left my heart in Lapland, thisisFINLAND by Ministry for Foreign Affairs of Finland

Finland
 
Finland geography-related lists
Lists of tourist attractions in Finland